Dadpur is a village in Polba Dadpur CD Block in Chinsurah subdivision of Hooghly district in the state of West Bengal, India.

Geography

Location

Police station
Dadpur police station has jurisdiction over a part of Polba Dadpur CD Block.

Urbanisation
In Chandannagore subdivision 58.52% of the population is rural and the urban population is 41.48%. Chandannagore subdivision has 1 municipal corporation, 3 municipalities and 7 census towns. The single municipal corporation is Chandernagore Municipal Corporation. The municipalities are Tarakeswar Municipality, Bhadreswar Municipality and Champdany Municipality. Of the three CD Blocks in Chandannagore subdivision, Tarakeswar CD Block is wholly rural, Haripal CD Block is predominantly rural with just 1 census town, and Singur CD Block is slightly less rural with 6 census towns. Polba Dadpur and Dhaniakhali CD Blocks of Chinsurah subdivision (included in the map alongside) are wholly rural. The municipal areas are industrialised. All places marked in the map are linked in the larger full screen map.

Demographics
As per the 2011 Census of India, Uttar Dadpur had a total population of 1,554 of which 795 (51%) were males and 759 (49%) were females. Population below 6 years was 153. The total number of literates in Uttar Dadpur was 1,194 (85.22% of the population over 6 years).

As per the 2011 Census of India, Dakshin Dadpur had a total population of 1,319 of which 678 (51%) were males and 641 (49%) were females. Population below 6 years was 135. The total number of literates in Dakshin Dadpur was 990 (83.61% of the population over 6 years).

Transport
A short stretch of Chunchura-Dhaniakhali Road links Dadpur to the Kolkata-Delhi NH 19/ Durgapur Expressway passes through Gurap.

References

Villages in Hooghly district